Aberdeen Historic District may refer to several places in the United States:

 Aberdeen Downtown Historic District, Aberdeen, Mississippi, listed on the National Register of Historic Places (NRHP) in Monroe County, Mississippi
 North Aberdeen Historic District, Aberdeen, Mississippi, listed on the NRHP in Monroe County, Mississippi
 South Central Aberdeen Historic District, Aberdeen, Mississippi, listed on the NRHP in Monroe County, Mississippi
 Aberdeen Historic District (Aberdeen, North Carolina), listed on the NRHP in Moore County, North Carolina
 Aberdeen Commercial Historic District, Aberdeen, South Dakota, listed on the NRHP in Brown County, South Dakota
 Aberdeen Highlands Historic District, Aberdeen, South Dakota, listed on the NRHP in Brown County, South Dakota
 Aberdeen Historic District (Aberdeen, South Dakota), NRHP-listed

See also 
 Aberdeen (disambiguation)